Mary Jane Maffini is a Canadian mystery writer. She has created three mystery series and written 12 novels.

Ladies Killing Circle & RendezVous Crime anthologies as well as Chatelaine magazine, Storyteller Magazine, and Ellery Queen's Mystery Magazine have published her short stories.  She has won two Arthur Ellis Awards for her short stories.

Biography
Mary Jane Maffini was born in Sydney, Nova Scotia, and holds a BA (Hons) and a Masters in Library Sciences (MLS) from Dalhousie University.

She is a member as well as a former President of Crime Writers of Canada and a former board of directors member of the Canadian Booksellers Association. She is a member of Capital Crime Writers and the Ladies Killing Circle.

Maffini is a frequent panellist at mystery conferences such as Bouchercon and Malice Domestic in the United States and Bloody Words National Mystery Conference in Canada. She lives in Ottawa, Ontario.

Publications

The Charlotte Adams Series
Closet Confidential May 2010
Death Loves a Messy Desk May 2009
The Cluttered Corpse April 2008
Organize Your Corpses Berkley Prime Crime, May 2007

The Camilla MacPhee series
Law and Disorder Fall 2009
The Dead Don't Get Out Much 2005
The Devil's in the Details 2004
Little Boy Blues 2002
The Icing on the Corpse 2001
Speak Ill of the Dead 1999

The Fiona Silk Series
Too Hot to Handle Fall 2007
Lament for a Lounge Lizard 2003

Short Fiction/RendezVous Crime Anthologies
The Ladies Killing Circle
Cottage Country Killers
Menopause is Murder
Cold Blood V
The Best of Cold Blood
Over the Edge
RendezVous Crime anthologies, Fit to Die 2001, Bone Dance 2003 and When Boomers Go Bad 2005.]

Awards
But the Corpse Can't Laugh Ellery Queen Mystery Magazine Readers' Choice List
 Winner of the Ottawa Citizen short story contest for Death Before Doughnuts 1994
 Arthur Ellis Award Best Short Story for Sign of the Times in the anthology Fit to Die 2001
 Arthur Ellis Award Best Short Story for Cotton Armour in the anthology The Ladies Killing Circle, 1995

Nominations
Speak Ill of the Dead Shortlisted for the Arthur Ellis Award for Best First novel
Kicking the Habit in Menopause is Murder Shortlisted for the Arthur Ellis best short story, 1999
Lament for a Lounge Lizard the first Fiona Silk mystery was nominated for the Arthur Ellis Best Novel Award, 1999
The Novel The Dead Don't Get out Much was nominated for a Barry Award, 2006

References

Sources
The Writers Union Profile of Mary Jane Maffini
Ottawa Public Library Notes from the Ottawa Room regarding local author Mary Jane Maffini
Arthur Ellis Awards for Best Crime Novel 2004
CBC Radio Canada, Mary Jane Maffini appearance on All in a Day with host Adrian Harewood

External links
 Official Mary Jane Maffini Website
 Mary Jane Maffini profile,  Crime Writers of Canada
 Mary Jane Maffini bio, Napoleon Publishing
Mary Jane Maffini profile, Capital Crime Writers website

Year of birth missing (living people)
Living people
Canadian women short story writers
Canadian mystery writers
Canadian women novelists
Writers from Nova Scotia
People from Sydney, Nova Scotia
Dalhousie University alumni
Agatha Award winners
Women mystery writers
20th-century Canadian novelists
21st-century Canadian novelists
20th-century Canadian women writers
21st-century Canadian women writers
20th-century Canadian short story writers
21st-century Canadian short story writers